"I Won't Take Less Than Your Love" is a song written by Paul Overstreet and Don Schlitz, and recorded by American country music artist Tanya Tucker with Paul Davis & Overstreet.  It was released in October 1987 as the second single from the album Love Me Like You Used To.  The single reached number one for the week of February 27, 1988, and spent fifteen weeks on the country chart.

Content
The song showcases three examples of servitude and gratitude, and the receiver—a man devoted to his wife, a grateful son, and a Christian deeply committed to serving God—seeking a way to repay the giver. Each one responds with the song's title line, the lesson being that love is worth more than all of the riches, comforts and treasures of the world.

The first verse (about the married couple) was sung by Davis, the second verse (about the mother-son relationship) by Tucker, and the final verse (the Christian) by Overstreet.

Charts

Weekly charts

Year-end charts

References

1987 singles
1987 songs
Paul Overstreet songs
Paul Davis (singer) songs
Tanya Tucker songs
Songs written by Paul Overstreet
Songs written by Don Schlitz
Capitol Records Nashville singles
Song recordings produced by Jerry Crutchfield
Vocal collaborations